Sir Hugh Paterson, 1st Baronet of Bannockburn, was a Scottish peer and landowner.

Life

He born in or around the year 1659.

Sir Hugh's father had acquired the Bannockburn estate from Andrew Rollo, 11th Laird of Duncrub and 3rd Lord Rollo. Paterson built much of the current house, and it is little changed since his time.

The Patersons were staunch Royalists and James VII gave Hugh the title of Baronet of Bannockburn. After Hugh Paterson's death on 21 December 1701, his son, the Second Baronet attainted his Baronetcy by being an open and fierce Jacobite, but he lived on at Bannockburn House.

In a brief stay at the house, Charles Edward Stuart met the 2nd Baronet's niece, Clementina Walkinshaw, who would eventually be the Young Prince's lover and mother of his daughter.

Family

Hugh married Jane Erskine, sister of James Erskine, Lord Grange bringing both Hugh and Jane into contact with James' notorious wife, Rachel Chiesley, Lady Grange.

References

1701 deaths
1659 births
Baronets in the Baronetage of Nova Scotia